Schwarzach is a municipality in the district of Neckar-Odenwald-Kreis, in Baden-Württemberg, Germany.
Schwarzach consists of the two former districts Oberschwarzach and Unterschwarzach.

Mayors
Since 2015: Mathias Haas
1991-2014: Theo Haaf

References

Neckar-Odenwald-Kreis